Arkansas Highway 203 (AR 203, Ark. 203, and Hwy. 203) is the designation for a state highway in the U.S. state of Arkansas. The route is split into two sections, both of which are located in southern Arkansas. The first section begins at US 278 in Hampton, Arkansas and ends at AR 274 east of East Camden. The second section begins at US 79B in Bearden and ends at AR 9 south of Holly Springs. Both sections are maintained by the Arkansas Department of Transportation (ARDOT).

Route description

Section 1
The first section of AR 203 begins at US 278 in Hampton, Arkansas. From there, AR 203 splits off and turns a more northerly direction and travels around the perimeter of the Shumaker Naval Ammunition Depot. The route then intersects AR 205 in northwestern Calhoun county before reaching its northern terminus at AR 274 just east of East Camden near the campus of Southern Arkansas University Tech.

Section 2
The second section of AR 203 begins at US 79 Business in Bearden, Arkansas. The route intersects US 79 almost immediately after its southern terminus, then travels in a relatively northwest direction for about  before reaching its northern terminus at AR 9 just south of Holly Springs. The route is about

Major intersections

References

 State highways in Arkansas#203
Roads in Arkansas